Seidu Yahaya (born 31 December 1989) is a Ghanaian footballer.

Career
Yahaya started his professional career at Tema Youth in 2006. In 2008, Yahaya was transferred from Tema Youth to Anagennisi Karditsa on a loan deal, where he featured 29 times for the Canaries all making it in the starting eleven. From Anagennisi he made it to AEK Athens where he featured five times. Although he made some good appearances in the start of the 2009–2010 season, including his first Europa League game against Everton at the Goodison Park in England, Yahaya fell out of favor with Dusan Bajevic quickly and was never featured again.

He was signed by Maccabi Haifa in 2010. In the first season with Maccabi Haifa Yahaya won the championship and lost in the cup final. Maccabi Haifa exercised Yahaya's contract option for the next three years where he left his previous number 18 shirt for his favorite number 6 shirt.

On the 20 June 2012, he signed a three-year contract with Liga I club Astra Giurgiu, which ended On 30 June 2015. He joined Sheriff Tiraspol on 14 June 2015 through where he won the Moldovan Supercup in his first game against Milsami Orhei.

Honours
Maccabi Haifa
Israeli Premier League (1): 2010–11
Israel State Cup Runner-up (2): 2010–11, 2011–12

Astra Giurgiu
 Cupa României (1): 2013–14
 Supercupa României (1): 2014
 Liga I Runner-up (1): 2013–14
Sheriff Tiraspol
 Moldovan National Division (2): 2015–16, 2016–17
 Moldovan Cup (1): 2016–17
 Moldovan Super Cup (1): 2015

References

External links
 
 

1989 births
Footballers from Accra
Living people
Ghanaian footballers
Association football midfielders
Ghanaian expatriate footballers
Expatriate footballers in Greece
Expatriate footballers in Israel
Expatriate footballers in Romania
Expatriate footballers in Moldova
Expatriate footballers in Belarus
Expatriate footballers in Saudi Arabia
Expatriate footballers in Latvia
Ghanaian expatriate sportspeople in Greece
Ghanaian expatriate sportspeople in Israel
Ghanaian expatriate sportspeople in Romania
Ghanaian expatriate sportspeople in Moldova
Ghanaian expatriate sportspeople in Belarus
Ghanaian expatriate sportspeople in Saudi Arabia
Ghanaian expatriate sportspeople in Latvia
Super League Greece players
Liga I players
Moldovan Super Liga players
Belarusian Premier League players
Latvian Higher League players
Saudi Professional League players
Tema Youth players
Anagennisi Karditsa F.C. players
AEK Athens F.C. players
Maccabi Haifa F.C. players
FC Astra Giurgiu players
FC Sheriff Tiraspol players
FC Dinamo Minsk players
Al-Fayha FC players
FK Liepāja players